The 2011–12 San Antonio Spurs season was the 45th season of the franchise, 39th in San Antonio and 36th in the National Basketball Association (NBA). The Spurs tied the Chicago Bulls for the best record of the season at 50–16, transmuted to 62–20 in an 82-game season, as the season was shortened to 66 games due to the 2011 NBA lockout.

The Spurs attained the first seed in the Western Conference, earning a berth in the 2012 NBA playoffs, where they swept both the Utah Jazz and the Los Angeles Clippers in four games in the First Round and Semifinals, respectively, only to be eliminated in six games by the Oklahoma City Thunder in the Western Conference Finals. The Thunder would go on to lose to the Miami Heat in the Finals in five games.

Key dates
June 23: The 2011 NBA draft took place at Prudential Center in Newark, New Jersey.
April 27: Defeating Golden State in the season finale, the Spurs achieved their 13th consecutive 50+ win season, a new NBA record.
May 1: Gregg Popovich announced as the recipient of the 2011–2012 NBA Coach of the Year Award.
May 7: With an 87-81 win the Spurs defeated the Utah Jazz in a 4-0 series sweep in the first round of the 2012 NBA Playoffs.
May 20: Spurs completed another series sweep, defeating the L.A. Clippers with a 102-99 win in the second round of the 2012 NBA Playoffs.
May 29: With the Spurs Game 2 victory over the Thunder, their 20th consecutive, the Spurs became only the 4th team in NBA history to win 20 or more straight victories.
June 6: The Spurs are defeated by the Oklahoma City Thunder in the Western Conference Finals in a six-game series.

Draft picks

Roster

Pre-season
Due to the 2011 NBA lockout negotiations, the programmed pre-season schedule, along with the first two weeks of the regular season were scrapped, and a two-game pre-season was set for each team once the lockout concluded.

|- bgcolor="#fcc"
| 1
| December 17
| @ Houston
| 
| DeJuan BlairManu Ginóbili (16)
| DeJuan Blair (7)
| T. J. Ford (6)
| Toyota Center12,859
| 0–1
|- bgcolor="ccffcc"
| 2
| December 21
| Houston
| 
| Tim Duncan (19)
| Gani LawalT. J. Ford (5)
| Tony ParkerTim Duncan (5)
| AT&T Center17,323
| 1–1

Regular season

Standings

Record vs. opponents

Game log

|- bgcolor="#ccffcc"
| 1
| December 26
| Memphis
| 
| Manu Ginóbili (24)
| Tiago Splitter (8)
| Tony Parker (7)
| AT&T Center18,581
| 1–0
|- bgcolor="#ccffcc"
| 2
| December 28
| L. A. Clippers
| 
| Manu Ginóbili (24)
| Tim Duncan, Kawhi Leonard (8)
| Tony Parker (9)
| AT&T Center18,581
| 2–0
|- bgcolor="#ffcccc"
| 3
| December 29
| @ Houston
| 
| DeJuan Blair (22)
| DeJuan Blair (8)
| Tiago Splitter (3)
| Toyota Center18,267
| 2–1
|- bgcolor="#ccffcc"
| 4
| December 31
| Utah
| | 
| Manu Ginóbili (23)
| DeJuan Blair (10)
| Tony Parker (8)
| AT&T Center17,769
| 3–1

|- bgcolor="#ffcccc"
| 5
| January 2
| @ Minnesota
| 
| Richard Jefferson, Tim Duncan (16)
| Matt Bonner (6)
| Tony Parker (9)
| Target Center14,514
| 3–2
|- bgcolor="#ccffcc"
| 6
| January 4
| Golden State
| 
| Tony Parker (21)
| Tim Duncan (11)
| Tony Parker, T. J. Ford (8)
| AT&T Center16,751
| 4–2
|- bgcolor="#ccffcc"
| 7
| January 5
| Dallas
| 
| Matt Bonner (17)
| Richard Jefferson (7)
| Tony Parker (8)
| AT&T Center18,581
| 5–2
|- bgcolor="#ccffcc"
| 8
| January 7
| Denver
| 
| Danny Green (24)
| DeJuan Blair (10)
| T. J. Ford (7)
| AT&T Center17,537
| 6–2
|- bgcolor="#ffcccc"
| 9
| January 8
| @ Oklahoma City
| 
| Gary Neal (18)
| Kawhi Leonard (10)
| Tony Parker (7)
| Chesapeake Energy Arena18,203
| 6–3
|- bgcolor="#ffcccc"
| 10
| January 10
| @ Milwaukee
| 
| Tony Parker (22)
| Tim Duncan (8)
| Tony Parker (8)
| Bradley Center11,585
| 6–4
|- bgcolor="#ccffcc"
| 11
| January 11
| Houston
|  (OT)
| Tony Parker (28)
| Tim Duncan (11)
| Tony Parker (8)
| AT&T Center17,381
| 7–4
|- bgcolor="#ccffcc"
| 12
| January 13
| Portland
| 
| Tony Parker (20)
| DeJuan Blair (11)
| Tony Parker (9)
| AT&T Center18,581
| 8–4
|- bgcolor="#ccffcc"
| 13
| January 15
| Phoenix
| 
| Tim Duncan (21)
| Tim Duncan (11)
| Tony Parker (9)
| AT&T Center18,581
| 9–4
|- bgcolor="#ffcccc"
| 14
| January 17
| @ Miami
| 
| Danny Green (20)
| Tim Duncan (7)
| Richard Jefferson (5)
| American Airlines Arena19,600
| 9–5
|- bgcolor="#ccffcc"
| 15
| January 18
| @ Orlando
|  (OT)
| Tony Parker (25)
| Tim Duncan (10)
| Tony Parker (9)
| Amway Center18,846
| 10–5
|- bgcolor="#ffcccc"
| 16
| January 20
| Sacramento
| 
| Tony Parker (24)
| Tim Duncan (10)
| Tony Parker (6)
| AT&T Center18,581
| 10–6
|- bgcolor="#ffcccc"
| 17
| January 21
| @ Houston
| 
| Tiago Splitter (25)
| Kawhi Leonard (11)
| Tony Parker (13)
| Toyota Center15,285
| 10–7
|- bgcolor="#ccffcc"
| 18
| January 23
| @ New Orleans
| 
| Tim Duncan (28)
| Tim Duncan (7)
| Tony Parker (17)
| New Orleans Arena12,599
| 11–7
|- bgcolor="#ccffcc"
| 19
| January 25
| Atlanta
| 
| Matt Bonner, DeJuan Blair (17)
| Tim Duncan (11)
| Tony Parker (7)
| AT&T Center17,888
| 12–7
|- bgcolor="#ffcccc"
| 20
| January 27
| @ Minnesota
| 
| Tony Parker (20)
| Tim Duncan (10)
| Tim Duncan (4)
| Target Center16,699
| 12–8
|- bgcolor="#ffcccc"
| 21
| January 29
| @ Dallas
|  (OT)
| Gary Neal (19)
| DeJuan Blair (9)
| Gary Neal (7)
| American Airlines Center20,262
| 12–9
|- bgcolor="#ccffcc"
| 22
| January 30
| @ Memphis
| 
| Matt Bonner (15)
| Kawhi Leonard (10)
| Tony Parker (12)
| FedExForum15,118
| 13–9

|- bgcolor="#ccffcc"
| 23
| February 1
| Houston
| 
| Tim Duncan (25)
| Matt Bonner (10)
| Tony Parker, Danny Green (4)
| AT&T Center18,581
| 14–9
|- bgcolor="#ccffcc"
| 24
| February 2
| New Orleans
| 
| Tim Duncan (19)
| Tim Duncan (9)
| Tony Parker (7)
| AT&T Center18,082
| 15–9
|- bgcolor="#ccffcc"
| 25
| February 4
| Oklahoma City
| 
| Tony Parker (42)
| Tim Duncan (15)
| Tony Parker (9)
| AT&T Center18,581
| 16–9
|- bgcolor="#ccffcc"
| 26
| February 6
| @ Memphis
| 
| Tony Parker (21)
| Tim Duncan (17)
| Tony Parker (7)
| FedExForum13,527
| 17–9
|- bgcolor="#ccffcc"
| 27
| February 8
| @ Philadelphia
| 
| Tony Parker (37)
| Tim Duncan (11)
| Tony Parker (8)
| Wells Fargo Center18,070
| 18–9
|- bgcolor="#ccffcc"
| 28
| February 11
| @ New Jersey
| 
| Gary Neal (18)
| Tim Duncan (10)
| Tim Duncan, Tony Parker (5)
| Prudential Center15,272
| 19–9
|- bgcolor="#ccffcc"
| 29
| February 14
| @ Detroit
| 
| Tim Duncan (18)
| Tim Duncan (13)
| Tony Parker, Manu Ginóbili (7)
| The Palace of Auburn Hills11,533
| 20–9
|- bgcolor="#ccffcc"
| 30
| February 15
| @ Toronto
| 
| Tony Parker (34)
| Danny Green (7)
| Tony Parker (14)
| Air Canada Centre15,999
| 21–9
|- bgcolor="#ccffcc"
| 31
| February 18
| @ L. A. Clippers
|  (OT)
| Tony Parker (30)
| Tim Duncan (17)
| Tony Parker (10)
| Staples Center19,217
| 22–9
|- bgcolor="#ccffcc"
| 32
| February 20
| @ Utah
| 
| Tony Parker (23)
| Kawhi Leonard (8)
| Tony Parker (11)
| EnergySolutions Arena19,105
| 23–9
|- bgcolor="#ffcccc"
| 33
| February 21
| @ Portland
| 
| Kawhi Leonard (24)
| Kawhi Leonard (10)
| Richard Jefferson, Cory Joseph, Gary Neal (3)
| Rose Garden20,567
| 23–10
|- bgcolor="#ccffcc"
| 34
| February 23
| @ Denver
| 
| Dejuan Blair (28)
| DeJuan Blair (12)
| Tony Parker (12)
| Pepsi Center18,875
| 24–10
|- align="center"
|colspan="9" bgcolor="#bbcaff"|All-Star Break 
|- bgcolor="#ffcccc"
| 35
| February 29
| Chicago
| 
| Gary Neal (21)
| Tim Duncan (10)
| Tony Parker (9)
| AT&T Center18,581
| 24–11

|- bgcolor="#ccffcc"
| 36
| March 2
| Charlotte
| 
| Tony Parker (15)
| DeJuan Blair (11)
| Tony Parker (4)
| AT&T Center18,581
| 25–11
|- bgcolor="#ffcccc"
| 37
| March 4
| Denver
| 
| Tony Parker (25)
| Tim Duncan (9)
| Tony Parker (7)
| AT&T Center18,581
| 25–12
|- bgcolor="#ccffcc"
| 38
| March 7
| New York
| 
| Tony Parker (32)
| Tim Duncan (8)
| Tony Parker, Manu Ginóbili (6)
| AT&T Center18,581
| 26–12
|- bgcolor="#ffcccc"
| 39
| March 9
| L. A. Clippers
| 
| Manu Ginóbili (22)
| Matt Bonner, Kawhi Leonard (6)
| Manu Ginóbili (6)
| AT&T Center18,581
| 26–13
|- bgcolor="#ccffcc"
| 40
| March 12
| Washington
| 
| Tony Parker (31)
| DeJuan Blair (12)
| Tony Parker, Manu Ginóbili (7)
| AT&T Center18,581
| 27–13
|- bgcolor="#ccffcc"
| 41
| March 14
| Orlando
| 
| Tony Parker (31)
| Tim Duncan (13)
| Tony Parker (12)
| AT&T Center18,581
| 28–13
|- bgcolor="#ccffcc"
| 42
| March 16
| @ Oklahoma City
| 
| Tony Parker (25)
| Tim Duncan (19)
| Tony Parker (7)
| Chesapeake Energy Arena18,203
| 29–13
|- bgcolor="#ffcccc"
| 43
| March 17
| @ Dallas
| 
| Danny Green, Tim Duncan (17)
| Tiago Splitter (6)
| Tony Parker (11)
| American Airlines Center20,528
| 29–14
|- bgcolor="#ccffcc"
| 44
| March 21
| Minnesota
| 
| Tim Duncan (21)
| Tim Duncan (15)
| Manu Ginóbili (8)
| AT&T Center18,581
| 30–14
|- bgcolor="#ccffcc"
| 45
| March 23
| Dallas
| 
| Danny Green (18)
| Tim Duncan (12)
| Manu Ginóbili (7)
| AT&T Center18,581
| 31–14
|- bgcolor="#ccffcc"
| 46
| March 24
| @ New Orleans
| 
| DeJuan Blair (23)
| Tim Duncan, DeJuan Blair, Kawhi Leonard, Danny Green (7)
| Tony Parker (10)
| New Orleans Arena16,118
| 32–14
|- bgcolor="#ccffcc"
| 47
| March 25
| Philadelphia
| 
| Tony Parker (21)
| Kawhi Leonard (10)
| Tony Parker (7)
| AT&T Center18,581
| 33–14
|- bgcolor="#ccffcc"
| 48
| March 27
| @ Phoenix
| 
| Tim Duncan (26)
| Tim Duncan (11)
| Tony Parker (7)
| US Airways Center16,573
| 34–14
|- bgcolor="#ccffcc"
| 49
| March 28
| @ Sacramento
| 
| Manu Ginóbili (20)
| Kawhi Leonard (9)
| Tony Parker (10)
| Power Balance Pavilion13,119
| 35–14
|- bgcolor="#ccffcc"
| 50
| March 31
| Indiana
| 
| Tim Duncan (23)
| Tim Duncan (11)
| Tony Parker, Manu Ginóbili (5)
| AT&T Center18,581
| 36–14

|- bgcolor="#ccffcc"
| 51
| April 3
| @ Cleveland
| 
| Patrick Mills (20)
| Tim Duncan (8)
| Boris Diaw (8)
| Quicken Loans Arena19,574
| 37–14
|- bgcolor="#ccffcc"
| 52
| April 4
| @ Boston
| 
| Danny Green (14)
| Tim Duncan (16)
| Gary Neal (4)
| TD Garden18,624
| 38–14
|- bgcolor="#ccffcc"
| 53
| April 6
| New Orleans
| 
| Tim Duncan (19)
| Stephen Jackson (7)
| Tony Parker (6)
| AT&T Center18,581
| 39–14
|- bgcolor="#ccffcc"
| 54
| April 8
| Utah
| 
| Tony Parker (28)
| Tim Duncan (13)
| Danny Green (5)
| AT&T Center18,581
| 40–14
|- bgcolor="#ffcccc"
| 55
| April 9
| @ Utah
| 
| Gary Neal (14)
| DeJuan Blair (8)
| Gary Neal (5)
| EnergySolutions Arena19,911
| 40–15
|- bgcolor="#ffcccc"
| 56
| April 11
| L. A. Lakers
| 
| Danny Green (22)
| Kawhi Leonard, Stephen Jackson (5)
| Tony Parker (8)
| AT&T Center18,581
| 40–16
|- bgcolor=#ccffcc
| 57
| April 12
| Memphis
| 
| Tim Duncan (28)
| Tim Duncan (12)
| Tony Parker (9)
| AT&T Center18,581
| 41–16
|- bgcolor="#ccffcc"
| 58
| April 14
| Phoenix
| 
| Tim Duncan (19)
| Tim Duncan (11)
| Tony Parker (5)
| AT&T Center18,581
| 42–16
|- bgcolor="#ccffcc"
| 59
| April 16
| @ Golden State
| 
| Gary Neal (17)
| Boris Diaw (9)
| Gary Neal, Tony Parker (5)
| Oracle Arena18,471
| 43–16
|- bgcolor="#ccffcc"
| 60
| April 17
| @ L. A. Lakers
| 
| Tony Parker (29)
| Tim Duncan, Matt Bonner (8)
| Tony Parker (13)
| Staples Center18,997
| 44–16
|- bgcolor="#ccffcc"
| 61
| April 18
| @ Sacramento
| 
| Gary Neal, Tiago Splitter (17)
| Tiago Splitter (7)
| Tony Parker (8)
| Power Balance Pavilion16,954
| 45–16
|- bgcolor="#ccffcc"
| 62
| April 20
| L. A. Lakers
| 
| Tim Duncan (21)
| Tim Duncan (8)
| Tony Parker (10)
| AT&T Center18,581
| 46–16
|- bgcolor="#ccffcc"
| 63
| April 22
| Cleveland
| 
| Manu Ginóbili (20)
| Tiago Splitter, Boris Diaw, Kawhi Leonard, DeJuan Blair (7)
| Tony Parker (9)
| AT&T Center18,581
| 47–16
|- bgcolor="#ccffcc"
| 64
| April 23
| Portland
| 
| Danny Green, Tim Duncan (18)
| Tim Duncan (8)
| Boris Diaw, Tony Parker (6)
| AT&T Center18,581
| 48–16
|- bgcolor="#ccffcc"
| 65
| April 25
| @ Phoenix
| 
| Patrick Mills (27)
| DeJuan Blair (8)
| Stephen Jackson (6)
| US Airways Center17,172
| 49–16
|- bgcolor="#ccffcc"
| 66
| April 26
| @ Golden State
| 
| Patrick Mills (34)
| DeJuan Blair (13)
| Patrick Mills (12)
| Oracle Arena18,124
| 50–16

Playoffs

Game log

|- bgcolor=ccffcc
| 1
| April 29
| Utah
| 
| Tony Parker (28)
| Tim Duncan (11)
| Tony Parker (8)
| AT&T Center18,581
| 1–0
|- bgcolor=ccffcc
| 2
| May 2
| Utah
| 
| Tony Parker (18)
| Tim Duncan (13)
| Tony Parker (9)
| AT&T Center18,581
| 2–0
|- bgcolor=ccffcc
| 3
| May 5
| @ Utah
| 
| Tony Parker (27)
| Tiago Splitter (8)
| Manu Ginóbili (10)
| EnergySolutions Arena19,911
| 3–0
|- bgcolor=ccffcc
| 4
| May 7
| @ Utah
| 
| Manu Ginóbili (17)
| Stephen Jackson (6)
| Tony Parker (3)
| EnergySolutions Arena19,911
| 4–0

|- bgcolor=ccffcc
| 1
| May 15
| L. A. Clippers
| 
| Tim Duncan (26)
| Boris Diaw (12)
| Tony Parker (11)
| AT&T Center18,581
| 1–0
|- bgcolor=ccffcc
| 2
| May 17
| L. A. Clippers
| 
| Tony Parker (22)
| Kawhi Leonard (6)
| Tony Parker (5)Manu Ginóbili (5)
| AT&T Center18,581
| 2–0
|- bgcolor=ccffcc
| 3
| May 19
| @ L. A. Clippers
| 
| Tony Parker (23)
| Tim Duncan (13)
| Tony Parker (10)
| Staples Center19,060
| 3–0
|- bgcolor=ccffcc
| 4
| May 20
| @ L. A. Clippers
| 
| Tim Duncan (21)
| Tim Duncan (9)
| Tony Parker (5)
| Staples Center19,060
| 4–0

|- bgcolor=ccffcc
| 1
| May 27
| Oklahoma City
| 
| Manu Ginóbili (26)
| Tim Duncan (11)
| Tony Parker (6)
| AT&T Center18,581
| 1–0
|- bgcolor=ccffcc
| 2
| May 29
| Oklahoma City
| 
| Tony Parker (34)
| Tim Duncan (12)
| Tony Parker (6)
| AT&T Center18,581
| 2–0
|- bgcolor=ffcccc
| 3
| May 31
| @ Oklahoma City
| 
| Tony Parker (16)S. Jackson (16)
| Manu Ginóbili (6)Kawhi Leonard (6)
| Gary Neal (5)
| Chesapeake Energy Arena 18,203
| 2–1
|- bgcolor=ffcccc
| 4
| June 2
| @ Oklahoma City
| 
| Tim Duncan (21)
| Kawhi Leonard (9)
| Gary Neal (4)Manu Ginóbili (4)
| Chesapeake Energy Arena 18,203
| 2–2
|- bgcolor=ffcccc
| 5
| June 4
| Oklahoma City
| 
| Manu Ginóbili (34)
| Tim Duncan (12)
| Manu Ginóbili (7)
| AT&T Center18,581
| 2–3
|- bgcolor=ffcccc
| 6
| June 6
| @ Oklahoma City
| 
| Tony Parker (29)
| Tim Duncan (14)
| Tony Parker (12)
| Chesapeake Energy Arena 18,203
|  2–4
|-

Player statistics

Regular season

Playoffs

Transactions

Trades

Free agents

Additions

Subtractions

Award winners
Tony Parker, NBA All-Star Western Conference reserve (4th appearance)
Tony Parker, Guard, All-NBA Second Team
Kawhi Leonard, Forward, All-Rookie First Team
Gregg Popovich, Western Conference Coach of the Month (February)
Gregg Popovich, Western Conference Coach of the Month (March)
Gregg Popovich, NBA Coach of the Year

References

San Antonio Spurs seasons
San Antonio Spurs
San Antonio
San Antonio